Burqan (also Romanized as Būrqān; also known as Bāzīkūn, Borqān, and Buzqān) is a village in Farmahin Rural District, in the Central District of Farahan County, Markazi Province, Iran. At the 2006 census, its population was 290, in 85 families.

References 

Populated places in Farahan County